Crocodilopolis ( Krokodeilópolis) was an ancient Egyptian settlement in Middle Egypt near present-day Faiyum.

Crocodilopolis may also refer to:
Sumenu, an ancient Egyptian town in Upper Egypt
Tel Tanninim, a hellenistic town in Israel